Sandeep Unnikrishnan, AC (15 March 1977 – 28 November 2008) was an Indian Army officer, who was serving in the 51 Special Action Group of the National Security Guards on deputation. He was Martyred in action during the November 2008 Mumbai attacks. He was consequently awarded the Ashoka Chakra, India's highest peacetime gallantry award, on 26 January 2009.

Early and personal life
Sandeep Unnikrishnan came from a Malayali family residing in Bangalore, where they had moved from Kozhikode, Kerala. He was the only son of retired ISRO officer K. Unnikrishnan and Dhanalakshmi Unnikrishnan.

Unnikrishnan attended The Frank Anthony Public School, Bangalore, graduating in 1995 in the ISC Science stream. He wanted to join the armed forces from childhood. He was married to Neha.

Military career
Unnikrishnan joined the National Defence Academy (India) (NDA), Pune, Maharashtra in 1995. He was a  part of the Oscar Squadron (No. 4 Battalion) and a graduate of the 94th Course NDA. He held a Bachelor of Arts degree.

In Indian Military Academy (IMA), Dehradun, he was the part of 104th regular course. On 12 June 1999, he graduated from IMA and got commissioned as Lieutenant in the 7th Battalion of the Bihar Regiment (Infantry) of Indian Army. During Operation Vijay in July 1999, he was regarded positively at the forward posts in the face of heavy artillery firing and small arms fire by Pakistan troops. On the evening of 31 December 1999, he led a team of six soldiers and established a post 200 metres from the opposing side and under direct observation and fire.

Unnikrishnan received a substantive promotion to captain on 12 June 2003, followed by promotion to major on 13 June 2005. During the 'Ghatak course' (at the Infantry wing Commando School, Belgaum), he topped the course twice earning an "Instructor grading" and Commendation.

He was also trained in High Altitude Warfare school, Gulmarg. After serving in different locations including Siachen, Jammu and Kashmir, Gujarat (during 2002 Gujarat Riots), Hyderabad and Rajasthan, he was selected to join the National Security Guards. On completion of training, he was assigned as the training officer of the 51 Special Action Group (51 SAG) of NSG, in January 2007 and also participated in various operations of the NSG.

Operation Black Tornado 
On the night of 26 November 2008, several buildings in South Mumbai were attacked. One of the buildings where hostages were held was the iconic 100-year-old Taj Mahal Palace Hotel. Major Sandeep Unnikrishnan was the team commander of 51 Special Action Group (51 SAG) deployed in the hotel to rescue the hostages. He entered the hotel with a group of 10 commandos and reached the sixth floor through the staircase. After evacuating hostages in the sixth and fifth floors, as the team descended the stairs, they suspected terrorists in a room on fourth floor, which was locked from the inside. As the commandos broke open the door, the round of fire by the terrorists hit Commando Sunil Kumar Yadav in both legs. Unnikrishnan managed to save and evacuate Yadav, but terrorists disappeared after blasting a grenade inside the room. Unnikrishnan and his team continued evacuating hostages from the hotel, for around 15 hours. On 27 November, around midnight Unnikrishnan and his team decided to take the path of the central staircase of hotel to go up, as it was their only path towards the hostages and terrorists. As expected, when terrorists saw commandos coming up through the central staircase, they ambushed NSG team, from the first floor, in which 27-year-old Commando Sunil Kumar Jodha was grievously injured by seven bullets (three in the left hand, one on his right palm, two in the right shoulder and one in his chest). Unnikrishnan arranged for his evacuation and continued to engage terrorists in the firefight. He then decided to chase terrorists alone, as they were trying to escape to the next floor. In the encounter that followed, he managed to corner all four terrorists to the Ballroom in the northern end of Taj Mahal hotel, single-handedly but sacrificed his life in the course. His last words were, "Don't come up, I will handle them" according to the NSG officials. NSG commandos later killed all four terrorists trapped in the Ballroom and Wasabi restaurant of the Mumbai Taj hotel.

Ashoka Chakra citation 

The official citation for the Ashoka Chakra Award reads:

Funeral

At Unnikrishnan's funeral, mourners chanted "Sandeep Unnikrishnan Amar Rahe" ("May Sandeep Unnikrishnan('s name) remain eternal"). Thousands of people lined up outside his Bangalore house to pay their respects. His funeral was held with full military honours.

Honour and legacy 
The Mother Dairy Double Road in Bengaluru, a  stretch from Federal Mogul on Doddaballapur Road to MS Palya junction, within Yelahanka New Town, was renamed Major Sandeep Unnikrishnan Road in his honour. A bust of Unnikrishnan is installed on Ramamurthy Nagar Outer Ring Road junction in Bangalore and is named in his honour.

There is a bust of Unnikrishnan at the entrance of Indian Education Society on Jogeshwari Vikhroli Link Road, Mumbai. An army housing complex at Whitefield, Bangalore is named 'Sandeep Vihar' and a bust of Unnikrishnan is installed in the center of Housing complex.

Biopic
A film, titled Major, stars Adivi Sesh in the titular role of Unnikrishnan. The film is produced by actor Mahesh Babu, Sony Pictures International Productions, and A+S Movies.

The principal photography of the film began in February 2020, and was released worldwide on 3 June 2022.

References

External links

Indian military personnel killed in action
Military personnel from Bangalore
1977 births
2008 deaths
People associated with the 2008 Mumbai attacks
Victims of the 2008 Mumbai attacks
Recipients of the Ashoka Chakra (military decoration)
People from Kozhikode
Malayali people
Military personnel from Kerala
Ashoka Chakra